Levipalpus is a moth genus of the superfamily Gelechioidea. It is placed in the family Depressariidae, which is often – particularly in older treatments – considered a subfamily of the Oecophoridae or included in the Elachistidae.

Species
Levipalpus hepatariella (Lienig & Zeller, 1846)

Footnotes

References
  (2009): Levipalpus. Version 2.1, 2009-DEC-22. Retrieved 2012-JAN-27.
  (2004): Butterflies and Moths of the World, Generic Names and their Type-species – Levipalpus. Version of 2004-NOV-05. Retrieved 2012-JAN-27.
  (2010): Markku Savela's Lepidoptera and some other life forms – Levipalpus. Version of 2010-FEB-02. Retrieved 2012-JAN-27.

Depressariinae
Moth genera